The Rural Municipality of Wise Creek No. 77 is a rural municipality (RM) in the Canadian province of Saskatchewan within Census Division No. 4 and  Division No. 3. It is located in the southwest portion of the province near Admiral.

History 
The RM of Wise Creek No. 77 incorporated as a rural municipality on January 1, 1913.

Geography

Communities and localities 
The following urban municipalities are surrounded by the RM.

Villages
 Cadillac

The following unincorporated communities are within the RM.

Localities
 Admiral, dissolved from village status on August 17, 2006
 Crichton 
 Driscol Lake 
 Frenchville

Demographics 

Government 
The RM of Wise Creek No. 77 is governed by an elected municipal council and an appointed administrator that meets on the second Wednesday of every month. The reeve of the RM is Denis Chenard while its administrator is Kathy Collins. The RM's office is located in Shaunavon. The RM shares this office with the RM of Grassy Creek.

Transportation 
Highway 13—serves Shaunavon
Highway 37—serves Shaunavon
Highway 722—serves Shaunavon

See also 
List of rural municipalities in Saskatchewan

References 

Wise Creek

Division No. 4, Saskatchewan